Stadio Marco Lorenzon is a multi-use stadium in Rende, Italy.  It is currently used mostly for football matches and is the home ground of Rende Calcio. The stadium holds 5,000.

External links
Stadio Marco Lorenzon at Soccerway

Marco Lorenzon